Or-n-More is the self-titled debut album by pop-duo Or-n-More, released on August 26, 1991. The album was released digitally in 2021 on Amazon Music, Apple Music, iTunes, and Spotify.

Track listing

 "Lonely Heart (Oh No)" (Orfeh, Mike More) – 3:51
 "Everyotherday" (Orfeh, More) – 3:50
 "Only 2 Hearts Know" (More) – 4:09
 "The Things That You Owe Me" (More) – 4:15
 "(That's) All I'll Ever Be" (More) - 4:15
 "Half a Heart" (More) - 4:15
 "The Right One" (More) - 4:00
 "Fool Hearted" (More) - 3:40
 "Sail On" (More) - 5:22
 "I Need Someone to Talk To" (More) - 3:52
 "Cry" (More) - 3:58
 "Love Life" (More) - 3:59
 "You Don't Know" [Japanese Bonus Track] (More) - 4:49
 "Everyotherday (Power Mix)" [Digital Bonus Track] (Orfeh, More) - 5:05	
 "Two Hearts Know (R&B Version)" [Digital Bonus Track] - 4:10

References

1991 debut albums
EMI Records albums
Rhythm and blues albums by American artists
Rock albums by American artists